Lophopogon is a genus of Indian plants in the grass family.

 Species
 Lophopogon kingii Hook.f. - Bihar
 Lophopogon tridentatus (Roxb.) Hack. - Andhra pradesh, Madhya Pradesh, Maharashtra, Tamil Nadu

 Formerly included
see Apocopis Germainia 
 Lophopogon intermedius - Apocopis intermedia 
 Lophopogon tenax - Germainia tenax 
 Lophopogon truncatiglumis - Germainia truncatiglumis

References

Andropogoneae
Poaceae genera
Endemic flora of India (region)
Taxa named by Eduard Hackel